The 1998 USISL A-League was an American Division II league run by the United Systems of Independent Soccer Leagues during the summer of 1998.

Regular season

Northeast Division

Atlantic Division

Central Division

Pacific Division

Conference Quarterfinals

Eastern Conference

Western Conference

Conference semifinals

Eastern Conference semifinal 1

The Hershey Wildcats advance to the Eastern Conference final.

Eastern Conference semifinal 2

Western Conference semifinal 1

The Minnesota Thunder advanced 4-2 on aggregate.

Western Conference semifinal 2

The San Diego Flash advance to the Western Conference championship.

Conference finals

Eastern Conference

The Rochester Rhinos advanced to the finals.

Western Conference

The Minnesota Thunder advanced to the final.

Final

MVP: Darren Tilley

Points leaders

Honors
 MVP: Mark Baena
 Leading goal scorer: Mark Baena
 Leading goalkeeper: Pat Onstad
 Defender of the Year: Scott Schweitzer
 Rookie of the Year: Mike Burke
 Coach of the Year: Pat Ercoli
First Team All League
Goalkeeper: Pat Onstad
Defenders: Gabe Eastman, Scott Schweitzer, Craig Demmin
Midfielders: Yari Allnutt, Mauro Biello, John Ball, Lee Tschantret
Forwards: Mark Baena, Darren Tilley, Amos Magee
Second Team All League
Goalkeeper: Joe Cannon
Defenders: Carl Fletcher, Steve MacDonald, Omid Namazi
Midfielders: Kevin Anderson, Jason Cairns, Antonio Robles, Kirk Wilson
Forwards: Gary Glasgow, Mike Burke, Josh Wolff

External links
 The Year in American Soccer – 1998
 United Soccer Leagues (RSSSF)
 1998 A-League

2
1998 in Canadian soccer
1998